Booktrack is the creator of the e-reader technology that incorporates multimedia such as music, sound effects, and ambient sound. The company was founded and maintains offices in Auckland, New Zealand and is headquartered in San Francisco, California. The company is privately funded by a wide range of investors including Peter Thiel, founder and former CEO of PayPal, and Mark D'Arcy, Director of Global Creative Solutions at Facebook.

Origin

The idea for Booktrack arose in 2008 when co-founder Mark Cameron regularly commuted by ferry in Auckland. He realized that as he read, a song would regularly come up on his music player that would complement the passage, with a bright song serendipitously accompanying a lighthearted passage. As he looked around the ferry at other commuters who were also simultaneously reading and listening to music, he realized the potential for a company that could replicate this experience, melding sound with text to provide an immersive reading environment. He reached out to his brother, Paul, and they spent three years building the technology before launching the site in August, 2011.

Product
The proprietary and patented technology behind Booktrack works by determining the speed at which any given reader is expected to progress through every word of a given text, and then matching music, sound effects, and ambient sound to every word. Using advanced algorithms, the audio is matched to readers' speed. Music, sound effects, and ambient audio tracks are recorded separately, allowing readers to set their own preferences.

Booktracks incorporate both original and licensed music from a wide range of sources. To date, Booktracks have included original music composed by acclaimed sound artist Stephen Gallagher performed by the New Zealand Symphony Orchestra, as well as music licensed from Sony/ATV Music Publishing. Many authors work in conjunction with the composers to develop appropriate music for their books.

Booktracks are available for download through the Booktrack Bookshelf app in the Apple App Store, Google Play and on a PC using a web browser.

Booktrack Studio

In September 2019, Booktrack introduced Booktrack Studio allowing writers and creatives to add a synchronized movie-style soundtrack—including music, ambient audio and sound effects—to a story, with the audio paced to each individual's reading speed. The platform enables writers to create and share stories and provides readers with a new type of reading experience.

The Booktrack Studio app was selected by Google to be featured on the re-launched Chrome Web Store. With Booktrack Studio anyone can easily add music, ambient sound and effects to any digital text, from a book or a short story to poetry or a travel blog. They can then immediately publish their work to the Booktrack Library for anyone to read and listen to. Versions are in development for mobile, all browsers and other e-reader platforms.

Booktrack Editions

The first Booktrack download was a version of The Power of Six, the second book in the Lorien Legacies by Pittacus Lore and the sequel to I Am Number Four. The book was released in conjunction with HarperCollins and James Frey's transmedia publishing company, Full Fathom Five. The Booktrack edition of The Power of Six includes more than 70 originally scored compositions and was produced under the direction of John Neill, the head of sound at Park Road Post, and includes contributions by award-winning composer and sound editor Stephen Gallagher.

The company also provided a Booktrack edition of  Sherlock Holmes' The Adventure of the Speckled Band. Since then, the company has published editions of  Salman Rushdie's short story  In the South  and classics including Rikki-Tikki-Tavi, The Ugly Duckling, The Selfish Giant, Hansel and Gretel, Peter Pan, The Adventures of Huckleberry Finn, and  Charles Dickens' A Christmas Carol.

Booktracks created by Booktrack Studio users can be read from the Booktrack Studio app.

Reception

Booktrack was met with a great interest, with articles written about it in The New York Times, The Atlantic, Mashable, Business Insider, the  Los Angeles Times  and  The Guardian  among others.   The Times  called Booktrack "An Advance in electronic publishing" while  The Huffington Post  said it was "Revolutionary", TechCrunch called it "An effort to create a whole new genre of e-books," and The Atlantic asked whether it might be "the future of reading."

While many praised the idea, several people criticized it as a bad idea that was counter to the entire purpose of a reading experience.

The Booktrack app was released on the iTunes Store, breaking into the top 100 free apps overall by downloads within two weeks of its launch.

Notes

Educational technology companies